Blandine Dancette (born 14 February 1988) is a French handball player for Nantes Handball and the French national team.

She participated in the 2011 World Women's Handball Championship and 2012, 2016 Olympics, winning a silver medal at the 2016 Olympics., and  2020 Olympics, winning the first gold medal at the 2020 Olympics.

In 2009, she was named French Division 1 Newcomer of the Year.

References

External links

1988 births
Living people
People from Firminy
French female handball players
Handball players at the 2012 Summer Olympics
Olympic handball players of France
Olympic gold medalists for France
Olympic silver medalists for France
Medalists at the 2016 Summer Olympics
Medalists at the 2020 Summer Olympics
Handball players at the 2016 Summer Olympics
Handball players at the 2020 Summer Olympics
Olympic medalists in handball
Sportspeople from Loire (department)
Mediterranean Games medalists in handball
Mediterranean Games gold medalists for France
Competitors at the 2009 Mediterranean Games